Fianarantsoa is a city (commune urbaine) in south central Madagascar, and is the capital of Haute Matsiatra Region.

History
It was built in the early 19th century by the Merina as the administrative capital for the newly conquered Betsileo kingdoms.

Fianarantsoa means "Good education" in Malagasy. It is a cultural and intellectual center for the whole island.  It is home to some of the oldest Protestant and Lutheran cathedrals on the island, the oldest theological seminary (also Lutheran), as well as the Roman Catholic Archdiocese of Fianarantsoa (seated in the Cathedral of the Holy Name of Jesus). The city of "good education" also boasts a university named after it and built in 1972. Fianarantsoa is considered to be the capital of wine in Madagascar, because of the presence of many wine industries in the city.

Geography

The town is linked to the rest of the country by the National road 7, one of the main highways in Madagascar. The distance is 411 km to the capital Antananarivo, 192 km to Ihosy,  518 km to Tulear.

Ranomafana National Park is a nature park popular among tourists that lies 65 km to the northeast of Fianarantsoa.

Climate
Köppen-Geiger climate classification system classifies its climate as subtropical highland (Cwb).

Rivers
Two rivers cross this town: the Mandranofotsy in the West, and the Tsiandanitra in the East. Both are affluents of the Matsiatra river.

Transport
The city is at the endpoint of the Fianarantsoa-Côte Est Railway to Manakara. There is also an airport. The city lies on the Route Nationale 7, which goes from the capital in Antananarivo to the coastal city of Toliara.

Education

 Université de Fianarantsoa
 Faculté de médecine de Fianarantsoa
French international schools:
 Collège français René-Cassin

Sports
 Football: the ASF Fianarantsoa is the local football team.

Personalities
 Odon Razanakolona (born 1946), archbishop
 Pety Rakotoniaina (born 1962), politician

See also
List of cities in Madagascar

References

External links

The World Monuments Fund's Watch Page for Fianarantsoa

 
Cities in Madagascar
Populated places in Haute Matsiatra
Regional capitals in Madagascar